Take a Powder is a 1953 British comedy film directed by Lionel Tomlinson and starring Julian Vedey, Max Bacon and Isabel George. A B film, it was made at Brighton Studios. The plot is set against the backdrop of the developing Cold War.

Cast
 Julian Vedey as Prof. Schultz  
 Max Bacon as Maxie  
 Isabel George as Betty  
 Maudie Edwards as Matron  
 Neville Gates as Bill  
 Fred Kitchen Jr. as Dr. Fowler  
 Alexis Chesnakov as Dr. Stroganoff  
 Larry Taylor as Spike 
 Bobby Beaumont 
 Gordon Craig 
 Joe Cunningham 
 Mark Singleton 
 Muriel White
 Diana Wynne

References

Bibliography
 Chibnall, Steve & McFarlane, Brian. The British 'B' Film. Palgrave MacMillan, 2009.

External links

1953 films
British comedy films
1953 comedy films
Films set in England
British black-and-white films
1950s English-language films
1950s British films
English-language comedy films